Mahati It is also written as Mahathi is a rāga in Carnatic music (musical scale of South Indian classical music) created by M. Balamuralikrishna. It is a four notes scale (tetratanic scale)  and does not belongs to one melakartha raga, It is classified in to 14th Vakulabharanam, 28th Harikāmbhōji and 34th melakarta rāgam Vagadhishvari in the 72 melakarta rāgam system of Carnatic music.

There is no equivalent raga in Hindustani music and scale in western music

Structure and Lakshana 

Amritha Kalyani is an symmetric rāgam does not contain rishabham, madhyamam and dhaivatam in the ascending and descending of the scale. Its  structure (ascending and descending scale) is as follows.

 : 
 : 

The notes used in this scale are shadjam, antara gandharam, panchamam, kaishiki nishadham in both ascending and descending scale. It is a chaturswara rāgam

Compositions 
The music composition available in this rāgam

 Mahaneeya Madhura - composed and sung by M Balamuralikrishna

Notes

References 

Janya ragas